Lily Banda is an actor, singer, songwriter, dancer and poet.

Biography
In 2020 she appeared on the Africa 35:35 list of The 35 most influential young African personalities.
In 2019, Banda appeared in The Boy Who Harnessed the Wind, based on the memoir by William Kamkwamba. She played Annie Kamkwamba.
She also starred as Aicha Konate in the second season of the TV series Deep State in 2019. Her character is a Malian interpreter who is ambushed and supposedly killed.

Filmography
2019: The Boy Who Harnessed the Wind 
2019: Deep State (TV series)

References

External links
Lily Banda at the Internet Movie Database

Living people
Malawian film actresses
21st-century Malawian women singers
People from Lilongwe
Year of birth missing (living people)